Breathe in Life is the debut studio album by French metalcore band Betraying the Martyrs, released on 20 September 2011 through record labels Sumerian and Listenable Records. It is the first release to feature current guitarist Lucas D'angelo as well as British-born lead vocalist Aaron Matts. The album was mixed by Charles J. Wall and the cover was created by the band bassist Valentin Hauser. It is the last album by the band to feature Antoine Salin on drums. "Life Is Precious" features guest vocals by Eddie Czaicki, who was the band's original vocalist.

Track listing

Personnel 
Betraying the Martyrs
Aaron Matts – lead vocals
Lucas D'Angelo – lead guitar, backing vocals, recording
Baptiste Vigier – rhythm guitar
Valentin Hauser – bass, layout, photo
Antoine Salin – drums
Victor Guillet – keyboards, clean vocals

Additional musicians
Eddie Czaicki – guest vocals on track 8
Kévin Traoré – guest vocals on track 11
Steve Garner – guest vocals on track 11

Additional personnel
Charles J. Wall – production, mixing, mastering
Betraying the Martyrs – production

References 

Betraying the Martyrs albums
2011 albums
Sumerian Records albums